Gaston Roudès (born 24 March 1878, Béziers, Hérault, France; d. 5 November 1958, Villejuif, Val-de-Marne, France) was a French actor, movie director and screenwriter best known for his silent movies of the 1920s and early 1930s. He directed more than 60 movies between 1911 and 1939.

Selected filmography
 House in the Sun (1929)
 Roger la Honte (1933)
 The House of Mystery (1933)
 Little Jacques (1934)

References
 Catalogue des films français de fiction de 1908 à 1918, by Raymond Chirat and Eric Le Roy (Cinémathèque Française, 1995).

External links 

French film directors
Silent film directors
French male screenwriters
20th-century French screenwriters
Silent film screenwriters
1878 births
1958 deaths
People from Béziers
20th-century French male writers